The Centre for Development and Enterprise (CDE) is an independent public policy research and advocacy non-profit organisation established in 1995. It is one of South Africa’s leading development think tanks, focusing on critical national development issues and their relationship to inclusive economic growth and democratic consolidation. CDE has a special focus on the role of business and markets in development. CDE advocates a high-growth and labour intensive economic strategy reliant on market-based solutions.
 
CDE has a full-time staff of about 20 people and a core of senior consultants, and uses local and international academics and other experts. Research produced for CDE is distilled into summary reports containing proposals that are tested before different audiences prior to being released. CDE runs an active outreach programme, aimed at disseminating its research and proposals as efficiently as possible. Stakeholders are commonly brought together to debate research findings and policy proposals, and invited to take action.

Lauritz Dippenaar is chairman of the CDE's board and Ann Bernstein is the organisation's executive director.

Mission 
CDE's stated vision includes: 
 A high growth, high employment, constitutional democracy;
 A competitive economy with opportunities for new entrants;
 An effective, clean state (and business community);
 Where private enterprise and markets are the key drivers of economic growth enabled by a supportive, smart government;
 Individuals are empowered through opportunity (jobs, growth, quality education and training); and
 Poverty and inequality are addressed by fostering a labour-intensive economy and better quality education and training.

Programmes

Jobs and Growth 
The Jobs and Growth Programme "engages with the policy choices South Africa faces by analysing existing policy and outcomes, assessing future policy directions, and offering practical, market-oriented alternatives".
 
Since the Jobs and Growth programme launched in 1996, CDE has worked with academics, researchers and policymakers on a variety of issues related to growth and employment, including migration policy, cities and urban development, labour-intensive growth, and youth unemployment.
 
CDE's position on growth is that "our economy will grow if government can find innovative ways of accelerating growth in labour-intensive sectors like manufacturing and reaping the urban dividend by transforming our cities into smart economic hubs where young people find jobs much more easily. A more flexible labour market would provide untold opportunities for the unemployed and the inexperienced; and market-driven solutions in many areas of the public arena would safeguard the country against many of the performance crises we have seen in our parastatals."

Education 
CDE's Education Programme "draws on many years of experience in analysing complex national policies and learning from international best practice to identify a sound foundation on which to build a better education system". The CDE has formalised the education research programme around three key themes:
 Low-fee independent schooling and its contribution to schooling provision by providing more access to quality education in disadvantaged communities. CDE's research covers topics such as modelling the financial viability of low-fee schools for growth and scale; appraising their quality and examining the regulatory and funding requirement. 
 Teacher education and development, with a particular focus on the challenges pertaining to initial teacher education. CDE's research covers the three phases of becoming a teacher: initial teacher education, induction for newly qualified teachers and continuing professional teacher development. 
 Mathematics and language for improved learner performance. Among the topics CDE researches in respect of mathematics and language are the relationship between language, reading and mathematics achievement;  strategies or interventions (internationally and locally); and the role of professional learning communities in enhancing mathematics teachers’ subject and pedagogical content knowledge.

International Think Tank Network 
In 2009 CDE launched an initiative to co-ordinate and collaborate with think tanks from other countries to learn from and give voice to the developing world. Professors Francis Fukuyama, Jagdish Bhagwati and Paul Romer were lead speakers together with Peter Berger and Ann Bernstein at the initial workshop in Washington, DC, designed to frame the project's objectives in Formulating Development Policies Led by Developing Country Voices.
 
It was agreed that the work would advocate for market-based development solutions and amplify research and thought from India, Brazil, South Africa initially in international debates on development strategy. The project's aim is to "promote modernisation (within a democratic context) without necessarily imposing the beliefs and cultures of ‘western modernity’ on the diverse people of the developing world".

CDE in collaboration with partner think-tanks in India (Centre for Policy Research) and Brazil (Instituto de Estudos do Trabalho e Sociedade) as well as the London-based Legatum Institute, set out over a period of more than two years to investigate the relationship between democracy, inclusive economic growth and poverty reduction in the developing world. The Democracy Works! project has drawn on workshops held in Delhi, Rio and Johannesburg, more than twelve research papers commissioned from scholars in all three countries, three country-specific reports, as well as contributions and advice from leading global experts and other international think-tanks.

References

External links
Centre for Development and Enterprise
CDE's Democracy Works project

Political and economic think tanks based in South Africa
Economy of South Africa
Foundations based in South Africa
Think tanks based in South Africa